Senator Gilmore may refer to:

Brenda Gilmore (born 1952), Tennessee State Senate
Henry Gilmore (1832–1891), Massachusetts State Senate
Joseph A. Gilmore (1811–1867), New Hampshire State Senate
Voit Gilmore (1918–2005), North Carolina State Senate
William H. Gilmore (1839–1910), Vermont State Senate

See also
Senator Gillmor (disambiguation)
John Adams Gilmer (1805–1865), North Carolina State Senate

John Adams Gilmer (1805–1865), North Carolina State Senate